The Round Church, also known as the Old Round Church, is a historic church on Round Church Road in Richmond, Vermont.  Built in 1812–1813, it is a rare, well-preserved example of a sixteen-sided meeting house. It was built to serve as the meeting place for the town as well as five Protestant congregations. Today it is maintained by the Richmond Historical Society and is open to the public during the summer and early fall, It is also available for weddings and other events.  It was declared a National Historic Landmark in 1996 for the rarity of its form and its exceptional state of preservation.

Description and history
The Round Church is set on the east side of Round Church Road, a short way south of the Winooski River and Richmond's main village center.  It is a two-story wood-frame structure with sixteen sides, finished with wooden clapboards and modest Federal period styling.  All but four sides have two sash windows; the wall section behind the pulpit has no windows, and three sides have doorways in the first level and windows in the second.  The doorways are framed by simple pilasters and unadorned entablatures.  The building is topped by a sixteen-sided roof with a two-stage octagonal belltower at the center.

The church was built in 1812–13 by William Rhodes, a native of Claremont, New Hampshire, where there was a sixteen-sided brick church (since demolished) whose only surviving view shows great similarity to this building.  Rhodes adapted the conventional meeting house to this distinctive form, borrowing at least some details from architectural pattern books, using a panel from Asher Benjamin's 1797 Public Builder's Assistant for the styling of the pulpit.  The construction was funded by the sale of pews, most of which were purchased by Congregationalists, but at least four other Christian denominations were represented.

The building was used for both religious service and town meetings for many years.  The Baptist Congregation folded in 1843, and the Congregationalists moved to a new building in 1850.  The Universalists built their own church in 1879, and the Methodists apparently stopped using this building in the 1880s.  The town continued to use it until 1973, when it was closed over concerns for its structural soundness.  The building had in 1927 undergone some work to shore up its leaning tower and sagging roof, but these changes may have been ineffective.  The town gave the building to the Richmond Historical Society in 1976, and it underwent a major restoration in 1980–81.  This restoration reversed major alterations made since its original construction (including, for example, the removal of a stairway to the attic), the careful reconstruction of the tower using similar materials (due to extensive rot in the original),  and a sympathetic reframing of the roof.

See also
List of National Historic Landmarks in Vermont
National Register of Historic Places listings in Chittenden County, Vermont

References

External links

National Historic Landmarks in Vermont
Historic American Buildings Survey in Vermont
19th-century churches in the United States
Churches completed in 1813
Churches on the National Register of Historic Places in Vermont
Buildings and structures in Richmond, Vermont
Tourist attractions in Chittenden County, Vermont
Churches in Chittenden County, Vermont
National Register of Historic Places in Chittenden County, Vermont